Callas is a commune in the Var department in the Provence-Alpes-Côte d'Azur region in southeastern France.

On a hill top very close to some of France's best wine growers' vineyards this ancient town looms over the valley below. It's a 45-minute drive from more famous coastal resort towns such as Fréjus and Saint-Raphaël and is only 75 minutes by car away from Nice.

See also
Communes of the Var department

References

External links 
Official Website

Communes of Var (department)